Pol or POL may refer to:

Places
 Pol State, a former princely state in Gujarat, western India; originally Vijaynagar State after its first capital
 Pol, Lugo, a municipality in Spain
 River Pol, a small river in Cornwall, England
 POL, ISO Alpha 3 code for the country of Poland

Codes
 POL, International Olympic Committee country code for Poland - see List of IOC country codes
 pol, ISO 639-2 and ISO 639-3 language codes for the Polish language

Transport
 POL, IATA airport code for Pemba Airport (Mozambique)
 POL, National Rail station code for Polsloe Bridge railway station, Devon, England
 POL, an abbreviation for port of loading

People

Given name
 Pól, an Irish and Faroese given name, and a list of people so named
 Pol (given name), usually a form of Paul or Polydore, with a list of people so named
Pol Pot (1925–1998), Cambodian revolutionary and Communist dictator

Surname
 Agusti Pol (born 1977), Andorran footballer
 Alejandro Pol Hurtado (born 1990), Venezuelan football midfielder
 Alexander Pol (1832–1890), Ukrainian archaeologist and geologist
 Alice Pol (born 1982), French actress
 Antoine Pol (1888–1971), French poet
 Ben Pol (born 1989), Tanzanian singer and songwriter
 David Pol (born 1973), Canadian football player
 Ernest Pohl, also known as Ernst Pol (1932–1995), Polish footballer
 Ferran Pol (born 1983), Andorran footballer
 Francisco Pol Hurtado (born 1990), Venezuelan football midfielder
 Miquel Martí i Pol (1929–2003), Catalan poet
 Nicolas Pol (born 1977), French artist
 Nicolaus Pol (c.1467–1532), Austrian physician and book collector
 Sandra de Pol (born 1975), Swiss footballer
 Santosh Pol (born 1974), Indian serial killer
 Sebastián Pol (born 1988), Argentine footballer
 Talitha Pol (1940–1971), Dutch actress and model, wife of John Paul Getty
 Victor de Pol (1865–1925), Italian-born Argentine sculptor
 Wincenty Pol (1807–1872), Polish poet and geographer

Fictional characters
 Pol (character), in Melanie Rawn's Dragon Prince and Dragon Star trilogies

Science and technology
Pol (gene)
 POL valve, a fitting found on older LPG cylinders
 Pol (HIV), a gene found in retroviruses
 Polystachya, abbreviation of a genus of orchid

Other uses
 HNoMS Pol III, a Norwegian Navy World War II patrol boat
 Pol language, a Bantu language of Cameroon
 Pol (housing), in India, a district in an "old city" area occupied by families of a particular ethnic group or caste
 POL (magazine) (1968?–1986), an Australian monthly magazine
 /pol/, the "politically incorrect" board on 4chan
 Party of the Left, in the Yale Political Union
 "Petroleum, Oil, and Lubricants", Class III of U.S. Armed Forces classes of supply
 Abbreviation for politician

See also
 Van der Pol, Dutch surname
Pole (disambiguation)
Pohl (disambiguation)
Poll (disambiguation)